The blue parrotfish (Scarus coeruleus) is a member of the parrotfish genus Scarus. It is found on coral reefs in shallow water in the tropical and subtropical parts of the western Atlantic Ocean and the Caribbean Sea. They usually forage in a group of 500 individuals for spawning and deterring predators while feeding.

Description
They are uniformly blue with a yellow spot on their heads that fades as they age. They develop a large "beak" like other parrotfish that is used for scraping algae and small organisms from rocks. They have pharyngeal teeth that grind ingested rocks into sand. No other species has this uniform blue color as adults.

Reproduction
In summer, blue parrotfish gather in spawning groups. Sexual interaction occurs and the females deposit their eggs into the water column after which they sink to the seabed. The eggs hatch after about twenty-five hours. Some special characteristics found in only female blue parrotfish are that there is an  existence of an annually immature all-female group. The other is that females in the sexually mixed group spawn without any seasonality.

Distribution and habitat
They are also found throughout the West Indies but are absent from the northern part of the Gulf of Mexico. Juveniles are found in beds of turtle grass (Thalassia testudinum). The Scarus Coeruleus fish greatly depend on coral reef systems to provide them with various food sources; however, this ecosystem has become threatened, which has now put the blue parrotfish and many other species endangered of becoming extinct from lack of food availability.

Diet
Their diet consists of small organisms found in the algae that they scrape off rocks. They are described as professional sand-suckers, due to their foraging of food amongst the sandy areas that surround the reef. They spend 80 percent of their time searching for food.

Status
The blue parrotfish has a wide range and is abundant in much of that range, some of which is in marine conservation areas. Although larger individuals are targeted by fishermen, the population of this fish seems to be stable overall. For these reasons, the IUCN has listed this fish as being of "Least Concern".

References

Further reading

External links
 

blue parrotfish
Fish of the Caribbean
Fish of the Dominican Republic
Fish of the Eastern United States
Fauna of Bermuda
Fauna of the Southeastern United States
blue parrotfish